Major-General Charles John Sackville-West, 4th Baron Sackville,  (10 August 1870 – 8 May 1962) was a British Army general and peer who served throughout the First World War and reached the rank of major general. In 1919, he was British Military Representative on the Supreme War Council and from 1920 to 1924 he was military attaché in Paris. He inherited his title on 28 January 1928 on the death of his brother, Lionel Edward Sackville-West, 3rd Baron Sackville. He served as Lieutenant Governor of Guernsey.

Early life and career
Sackville-West was born in 1870, the second son of Colonel the Hon. William Edward Sackville-West and Georgina Dodwell. His father was the youngest son of the 5th Earl De La Warr and a younger brother of the 1st and 2nd Barons Sackville. As the younger son of a younger son of an earl, Sackville-West was not entitled to any particular style from birth, though his elder brother succeeded to the title of Lord Sackville in 1908. On 14 June 1910, however, he and his siblings were granted the style of Honourable by royal decree, to  "henceforth have hold and enjoy the same title, rank, place and precedence as would have been due to them if their father, William Edward Sackville-West had survived his brother, the said Lionel Sackville, Baron Sackville, and had thereby succeeded to the title and dignity of Baron Sackville."

Sackville-West was educated at Winchester College, Hampshire, followed by the Royal Military College, Sandhurst.

On 18 December 1889, Sackville-West was commissioned into the King's Royal Rifle Corps as a second lieutenant and participated in the 1891 Anglo-Manipur War (for which he was mentioned in dispatches) and the 1892 expedition to Burma. He was promoted to lieutenant on 4 November 1891, and appointed an adjutant on 1 May 1894. By the mid-1890s, Sackville-West was serving as a staff officer in a number of posts. He was promoted to captain on 27 January 1898, and on 9 October was seconded to the staff and appointed an aide-de-camp to General Sir Redvers Buller, later a prominent commander in the Second Boer War. For his services during the war, Sackville-West received a brevet promotion to major on 29 November 1900, and was also mentioned in dispatches.

Following his return from the war, Sackville-West was in October 1901 appointed Aide-de-camp to Lieutenant-General Sir Henry Hildyard, Commanding the 1st Army Corps. He returned to his regiment in early January 1903, but was posted seconded to attend Staff college the following month, and was appointed a staff captain in January 1905. He was promoted to major on 2 August 1905. In 1906, Sackville-West was attached to the Staff College, Camberley, receiving an appointment as a deputy assistant adjutant-general with the temporary rank of lieutenant-colonel on 21 December. He was appointed a GSO 2 for the London District on 27 November 1909. He was transferred to the War Office in the same grade on 1 October 1910, receiving promotions to brevet lieutenant-colonel and then to substantive lieutenant-colonel on 1 April 1914.

First World War
At the outbreak of the First World War, Sackville-West was at the War Office. He was appointed a GSO 1 on 16 January 1915. However, the need for experienced officers in the field prompted his movement to the Indian Army Corps on the Western Front until 3 December 1915, when he was given command of the 21st Infantry Brigade and promoted to brigadier-general.

On 30 July 1916, at the height of the Battle of the Somme, Sackville-West was wounded in an attack by a German bomber on his brigade headquarters. Evacuated to Britain, he had recovered by October, when he took over the 190th Infantry Brigade. Within days of this posting, however, Sackville-West was wounded in the jaw when a high-explosive shell detonated in the midst of his command group as he inspected the trenches in front of Hamel. Although wounded, dazed and partially buried, Sackville-West was able to reach the casualty clearing station unaided, and was again evacuated to Britain to recover.

Returning to the Western Front for the third time in March 1917, Sackville-West commanded the 182nd Infantry Brigade from 11 March until 18 November, when he was appointed brigadier-general on the General Staff, serving as chief of staff to Sir Henry Wilson on the Supreme War Council. On 19 February 1918 Wilson became Chief of the Imperial General Staff at the War Office, and Sackville-West succeeded him as British Military Representative at Versailles. He was promoted to the substantive rank of colonel on 1 April 1918, with seniority from 12 February 1916, and to major-general on 1 January 1919, with temporary rank backdated to 18 November 1917.

Sackville-West received several decorations during his wartime service. He was appointed a Companion of the Order of St. Michael and St. George (CMG) on 18 February 1915, and was knighted as a Knight Commander of the Order of the British Empire (KBE) in the 1919 Birthday Honours on 3 June 1919. He was also decorated as a Commander of the Legion of Honour of France in 1918 and as a Grand Officer of the Order of the Crown of Italy in 1919. In 1921, he was decorated with the Italian Cross of War, followed by the Cross of War of France.

Later career
From 15 January 1920 until 15 January 1924, Sackville-West was military attaché in Paris. From 1 July 1925 to his retirement on 5 June 1929 he served as Lieutenant Governor of Guernsey.

Family
Sackville-West married Maude Cecilia Bell in 1897, with whom he had one son and one daughter. In 1924 he married for a second time, to Mrs Anne Meredith Bigelow. In 1928, on the death of his elder brother Lionel Sackville-West, Charles inherited his uncle's title of Baron Sackville and sat in the House of Lords until his death in 1962. His son Edward inherited the title and later became a noted author.

Notes

References 

1870 births
1962 deaths
People educated at Winchester College
Graduates of the Royal Military College, Sandhurst
King's Royal Rifle Corps officers
British Army personnel of the Second Boer War
British Army generals of World War I
Barons in the Peerage of the United Kingdom
Knights Commander of the Order of the British Empire
Companions of the Order of the Bath
Companions of the Order of St Michael and St George
Charles Sackville-West, 04 Baron Sackville
Charles
Academics of the Staff College, Camberley